Marc Yor (24 July 1949 – 9 January 2014) was a French mathematician well known for his work on stochastic processes, especially properties of semimartingales, Brownian motion and other Lévy processes, the Bessel processes, and their applications to mathematical finance.

Background
Yor was a professor at the Paris VI University in Paris, France, from 1981 until his death in 2014.

He was a recipient of several awards, including the Humboldt Prize, the Montyon Prize, and was awarded the Ordre National du Merite by the French Republic. He was a member of the French Academy of Sciences.
His students include such notable mathematicians as Jean-Francois Le Gall and Jean Bertoin.

He died on 9 January 2014 at the age of 64.

Bibliography

Books
 Yor, M. (1992). Some Aspects of Brownian Motion. Part I: Some Special Functionals. Birkhäuser.
 Yor, M. (1997). Some Aspects of Brownian Motion. Part II: Some Recent Martingale Problems. Birkhäuser.
 Revuz, D., & Yor, M. (1999). Continuous martingales and Brownian motion. Springer.
 Yor, M. (2001). On Exponential Functionals of Brownian Motion and Related Processes. Springer.
 Emery, M., & Yor, M. (Eds.). (2002). Séminaire de probabilités 1967-1980: a selection in Martingale theory. Springer.
 Chaumont, L. & Yor, M. (2003). Exercises in Probability: A Guided Tour from Measure Theory to Random Processes, via Conditioning. Cambridge University Press.
 Mansuy, R. & Yor, M. (2006). Random Times and Enlargements of Filtrations in a Brownian Setting. Springer.
 Mansuy, R. & Yor, M. (2008). Aspects of Brownian Motion. Springer.
 Roynette, B. & Yor, M. (2009). Penalising Brownian Paths. Springer.
 Jeanblanc, M. & Yor, M., Chesney, M. (2009). Mathematical methods for financial markets. Springer.
 Profeta, C., Roynette, B. & Yor, M. (2010). Option Prices as Probabilities. Springer.
 Hirsch, F., Profeta, C., Roynette, B. & Yor, M. (2011). Peacocks and associated martingales, with explicit constructions. Springer.

Main papers
 Yor, M. (2001). Bessel processes, Asian options, and perpetuities. In Exponential Functionals of Brownian Motion and Related Processes (pp. 63–92). Springer Berlin Heidelberg.
 Pitman, J., & Yor, M. (1997). The two-parameter Poisson-Dirichlet distribution derived from a stable subordinator. The Annals of Probability, 25(2), 855-900.
 Pitman, J., & Yor, M. (1982). A decomposition of Bessel bridges. Probability Theory and Related Fields, 59(4), 425-457.

References

1949 births
2014 deaths
20th-century French mathematicians
Probability theorists
University of Paris alumni
Members of the French Academy of Sciences
Donegall Lecturers of Mathematics at Trinity College Dublin
Knights of the Ordre national du Mérite